Muang Phôn-Hông, also known as Phonhong, (Lao language: ໂພນໂຮງ) is a town and capital of Vientiane Province, Laos. The town had a population of 30,805 in 2015.

Gallery

References

Populated places in Vientiane Province